Amboy Airfield is an abandoned airport in the area of Amboy, California, which was used primarily during World War II. The exact date of the airport's opening is undetermined even though the earliest reference to the airfield was published on June 5, 1925, in the Oxnard Daily Courier.

See also
Grand Theft Auto V
Roy's Motel and Café
List of defunct airports in the United States

References

Defunct airports in California
Airports in Los Angeles County, California
Airports in California